Njombe is a town in southern Tanzania. It is the regional capital of Njombe Region as well as the district headquarter of Njombe Rural District and Njombe Urban District. It is located at nearly 2000 meters of altitude on the eastern edge of the Kipengere Range and has the reputation of being a cold town.

Transport

Road
Paved Trunk road T6 from Makambako to Songea passes through the town.

Railway Station
The nearest train station on the TAZARA Railway - from Dar es Salaam to Lusaka - is located in the town of Makambako.

Airport
The nearest airstrip in Njombe is available at Melinze street near Mjimwema ward, most of time the airport is used by private flights and three years back there was commercial flight from Njombe airport to Dar es Salaam  airport  terminal 1 by Auriq air

Population
According to the 2012 national census the population of Njombe town - Njombe Mjini and Mjimwema wards - is 40,607.

Climate

References

Populated places in Njombe Region
Regional capitals in Tanzania